Chōshū may refer to:

 Nagato Province
 Urakusai Nagahide, a designer of ukiyo-e style Japanese woodblock prints
 Chōshū Domain, a feudal domain of Japan during the Edo period
 Koriki Chōshū (born 1972), a Japanese comedian
 Riki Chōshū (born 1951), a Korean-Japanese professional wrestler

Japanese-language surnames